Dønnerup, formerly known as Benzonslund, is a manor house and estate located approximately five kilometres south of Jyderup, in Holbæk Municipality, some 80 kilometres west of Copenhagen, Denmark. The estate covers approximately 1,700 hectares and comprises Rangle Mølle and Holmstrup. The current main building was built in Gothic Revival style in 1933 after the old one had been destroyed in a fire.

History

1730–1820: Early history
Dønnerup was originally a village first mentioned as Dindethorp in 1199. It consisted of 12 farms and a couple of houses without land in 1688. Supreme Court justice Peder Benzon was granted royal permission to close the village and convert the land into a new manor under the name Benzonslund.

Benzon died in 1735. His heirs were initially unable to find a buyer for the estate but in 1737 it was finally sold to Henrik von Eickstedt, a 22-year-old nobleman who would later become known as one of the leaders in the revolt against Johann Friedrich Struensee.

Poul Christian von Stemann purchased Benzonslund in 1791. He achieved a successful career at the royal court, which would later culminate with his appointment to president of Danish Chancellery in 1827. He sold Benzonslund tp Johannes Meldahl in 11800. He sold it to Cecilius Andreas Ulrik Rosenørn in 1806. Rosenørn had four children while he lived on the estate, including later Cultus Minister Ernst Emil Rosenørn.

1820–1925: Zytphen-Adeler family
 
Benzonszlund was sold after Rosenørn's early death in 1820. The new owner was Bertha Adeler, the widow of Frederik, Baron Adeler, whose ambition it was to restore the Barony of Adelersborg (now Dragsholm Castle). Georg Frederik Otto von Zytphen, who was married to Bertha Adeler's grand daughter, was ennobled under the name Zytphen-Adeler in 1838. He managed the Benzonszlund  estate from 1839 and became its owner in 1843.

Zytphen-Adeler introduced many improvements in the management of the estate. In 1867. he was granted royal permission to rename it Dønnerup after the former village.

1925–present: Later history
The barony was dissolved in 1925 and Dønnerup was at the same time sold to Aage Hastrup. The main building was destroyed in a fire but a new one was constructed in 1932-33. Members of the Hastrup family owned the estate until 1994.

Architecture
Dønnerup is built in Gothic Revival style. It consists of a main wing with crow-stepped gables flanked by two detached side wings. All three buildings are white-washed with red tile roofs and have crow-stepped gables.

Today
Dønnerup is owned and operated by Dønnerup A/. The estate covers 1276 hectares of land (2011) of which 173 hectares are farmland, 219 are hectares are pastures and 809 hectares are woodland.

List of owners
 (1730-1735)     Peder Benzon
 (1735-1737)     The estate after Peder Benzon
 (1737-1739)     Hans Henrik von Eickstedt
 (1739-1745)     Reimer Henrich von Barner
 (1745-1757)     Peder Willumsen
 (1757-1783)     Christian Henrich Selchau
 (1783-1791)     Christian Andreas Selchau
 (1791-1800)     Poul Christian von Stemann
 (1800-1806)     Johannes Meldahl
 (1806-1820)     Cecilius Andreas Ulrik Rosenørn
 (1820-1843)     Bertha Adeler, née Moltke
 (1843-1878)     Georg Frederik Otto von Zytphen-Adeler
 (1878-1908)     Frederik Herman Christian von Zytphen-Adeler
 (1908-1925)     Georg Frederik de Falsen von Zytphen-Adeler
 (1925-1968)     Aage Hastrup
 (1968-1988)     Allan Hastrup
 (1988-1994)     Andreas Hastrup
 (1994-2000)     Dønnerup A/

References

External links

 Official website

Manor houses in Holbæk Municipality
Houses completed in 1833
1730 establishments in Denmark
Buildings and structures associated with the Benzon  family
Buildings and structures associated with the Adeler family